The 2017–18 Columbus Blue Jackets season was the 18th season for the National Hockey League franchise that was established on June 25, 1997.

Standings

Schedule and results

Preseason
The preseason schedule was published on June 19, 2017.

Regular season
The regular season schedule was released on June 22, 2017.

Playoffs

Player statistics
As of April 23, 2018
Skaters

Goaltenders

†Denotes player spent time with another team before joining the Blue Jackets. Statistics reflect time with the Blue Jackets only.
‡Denotes player was traded mid-season. Statistics reflect time with the Blue Jackets only.
Bold/italics denotes franchise record.

Transactions
The Blue Jackets have been involved in the following transactions during the 2017–18 season.

Trades

Notes:
  The Vegas Golden Knights will not select Josh Anderson, Jack Johnson, or Joonas Korpisalo in the 2017 NHL Expansion Draft

Free agents acquired

Free agents lost

Claimed via waivers

Lost via waivers

Lost via retirement

Player signings

Draft picks

Below are the Columbus Blue Jackets' selections at the 2017 NHL Entry Draft, which was held on June 23 and 24, 2017 at the United Center in Chicago.

Draft notes:
 The Tampa Bay Lightning's second-round pick went to the Columbus Blue Jackets as the result of a trade on June 24, 2017 that sent Keegan Kolesar to Vegas in exchange for this pick.
 The New York Islanders' sixth-round pick went to the Columbus Blue Jackets as the result of a trade on June 23, 2017 that sent Brandon Saad, Anton Forsberg and a fifth-round pick in 2018 to Chicago in exchange for Artemi Panarin, Tyler Motte and this pick.

References

Columbus Blue Jackets seasons
Columbus Blue Jackets
Blue
Blue